The 1988 Players Championship was a golf tournament in Florida on the PGA Tour, held  at TPC Sawgrass in Ponte Vedra Beach, southeast of Jacksonville. It was the fifteenth Players Championship and the first without "Tournament" in the title.

Local resident Mark McCumber opened with 65 and won with 273 (−15), four strokes ahead of runner-up Mike Reid. McCumber's  score at the Stadium Course set a record; it was equaled in 1992 and broken in 1993.

Jay Haas was disqualified on Thursday after playing with a bent putter. Davis Love III had a similar occurrence on Friday, while Curtis Strange reported that he signed an incorrect  (Strange won the next two U.S. Opens.)

Weather delays on Saturday caused the leaders to complete only a few holes of the third round; play was resumed early on Sunday morning. 

Defending champion Sandy Lyle missed the 36-hole cut by six strokes, and the purse was increased 25% this year to $1.25 million.

Venue

Field
Fulton Allem, Isao Aoki, Paul Azinger, Seve Ballesteros, Dave Barr, Andy Bean, Chip Beck, Ronnie Black, Phil Blackmar, Jay Don Blake, Ken Brown, George Burns, Curt Byrum, Tom Byrum, Mark Calcavecchia, Jim Carter, Chen Tze-chung, Bobby Clampett, Keith Clearwater, Lennie Clements, Russ Cochran, John Cook, Fred Couples, Ben Crenshaw, Rodger Davis, Mike Donald, Ed Dougherty, Bob Eastwood, Danny Edwards, David Edwards, Dave Eichelberger, Steve Elkington, Brad Fabel, Nick Faldo, Brad Faxon, Rick Fehr, Ed Fiori, Raymond Floyd, Dan Forsman, David Frost, Buddy Gardner, Bob Gilder, Bill Glasson, Wayne Grady, David Graham, Hubert Green, Ken Green, Jay Haas, Gary Hallberg, Dan Halldorson, Donnie Hammond, Morris Hatalsky, Mark Hayes, Vance Heafner, Lon Hinkle, Scott Hoch, Mike Hulbert, John Huston, John Inman, Hale Irwin, David Ishii, Peter Jacobsen, Steve Jones, Tom Kite, Kenny Knox, Gary Koch, Billy Kratzert, Bernhard Langer, Wayne Levi, Bruce Lietzke, Bob Lohr, Davis Love III, Mark Lye, Sandy Lyle, Andrew Magee, John Mahaffey, Roger Maltbie, Dick Mast, Blaine McCallister, Mike McCullough, Mark McCumber, Pat McGowan, Rocco Mediate, Johnny Miller, Larry Mize, Gil Morgan, Jodie Mudd, Tsuneyuki Nakajima, Larry Nelson, Jack Nicklaus, Greg Norman, Andy North, Mac O'Grady, Mark O'Meara, David Ogrin, Akiyoshi Ohmachi, Steve Pate, Corey Pavin, Calvin Peete, Chris Perry, Kenny Perry, Dan Pohl, Don Pooley, Nick Price, Tom Purtzer, Sam Randolph, Mike Reid, Jack Renner, Larry Rinker, Loren Roberts, Bill Rogers, Clarence Rose, Dave Rummells, Bill Sander, Gene Sauers, Tom Sieckmann, Tony Sills, Scott Simpson, Tim Simpson, Joey Sindelar, Jeff Sluman, J. C. Snead, Craig Stadler, Payne Stewart, Ray Stewart, Curtis Strange, Mike Sullivan, Hal Sutton, Doug Tewell, Leonard Thompson, Bob Tway, Howard Twitty, Bobby Wadkins, Lanny Wadkins, Fred Wadsworth, Denis Watson, Tom Watson, D. A. Weibring, Mark Wiebe, Willie Wood, Ian Woosnam, Robert Wrenn, Fuzzy Zoeller, Richard Zokol

Round summaries

First round
Thursday, March 24, 1988

Source:

Second round
Friday, March 25, 1988

Source:

Third round
Saturday, March 26, 1988
Sunday, March 27, 1988

Due to weather delays, McCumber completed the last fourteen holes of his third round on Sunday morning and went to his nearby home between rounds.

Source:

Final round
Sunday, March 27, 1988

References

External links
The Players Championship website

1988
1988 in golf
1988 in American sports
1988 in sports in Florida
March 1988 sports events in the United States